New Castile is a historic region of Spain. It roughly corresponds to the historic Moorish Taifa of Toledo, taken during the Reconquista of the peninsula by Christians and thus becoming the southern part of Castile. The extension of New Castile was formally defined after the 1833 territorial division of Spain as the sum of the following provinces: Ciudad Real, Cuenca, Guadalajara, Madrid and Toledo.

Key to the reconquest of New Castile were the capture of Toledo in 1085, ending the Taifa's Kingdom of Toledo, and the Battle of Las Navas de Tolosa in 1212. It continued to be called the Kingdom of Toledo when it was in the Crown of Castile. Then, it started to be called New Castile in the 18th century.

New Castile is separated from Old Castile to the north by the Sistema Central range of mountains. In the current territorial division of Spain, it covers the autonomous communities of Madrid and Castile–La Mancha (which also includes Albacete).

See also
Castile (historical region)
Old Castile
Castile–La Mancha
Kingdom of Toledo
Nueva Castilla in the Spanish East Indies
Nueva Castilla in Spanish America

External links
Jerónimo López-Salazar Pérez, La Historia Rural en Castilla la Nueva y Extremadura, Ed. Univ. de Salamanca
 Castilla la Nueva; (1885), by Quadrado, José María, 1819–1896; Fuente, Vicente de la, 1817–1889,

History of Castile
Castilla–La Mancha
Geography of Castilla–La Mancha
Historical regions